Eelo University, often abbreviated EU, is a comprehensive, private university located in the city of Borama in the northwestern of Somaliland.

Eelo University was legally mandated by the Ministry of Education in the year 2007 to address pertinent issues affecting the adjacent communities in the Horn of Africa. The University is located in western Somaliland. It lies between the 08°00′ – 11°30′ parallel north of the equator and between 42°30′ – 49°00′ meridian east of Greenwich. It is bordered by Djibouti to the west, Ethiopia to the south, and Somalia to the east.

References

Universities in Somaliland
2007 establishments in Somalia
Educational institutions established in 2007
Awdal